Anne-Marie Rindom (born 14 June 1991 in Søllerød) is a Danish sailor. She competed in the Laser Radial class event at the 2012 Summer Olympics, where she placed 13th. She won the 2015 Women's Laser Radial World Championship.  At the 2016 Summer Olympics, she won the bronze medal in the Laser Radial event. She won gold at the 2020 Summer Olympics, in Laser Radial.

In 2021, Rindom confirmed that she had joined the Denmark SailGP Team presented by ROCKWOOL to compete in Season 2 of SailGP.

References

External links
 
 
 

1991 births
Living people
Danish female sailors (sport)
Olympic sailors of Denmark
Olympic medalists in sailing
Olympic bronze medalists for Denmark
Olympic gold medalists for Denmark
Sailors at the 2012 Summer Olympics – Laser Radial
Sailors at the 2016 Summer Olympics – Laser Radial
Sailors at the 2020 Summer Olympics – Laser Radial
Medalists at the 2016 Summer Olympics
Medalists at the 2020 Summer Olympics
Europe class world champions
World champions in sailing for Denmark
People from Rudersdal Municipality
Sportspeople from the Capital Region of Denmark